Mount Vernon railway station is a railway station located in the Mount Vernon area of Glasgow, Scotland. Train services are provided by ScotRail.

History 
The Rutherglen and Coatbridge Railway opened a station on this site in 1866. It was closed to passengers in 1943, although the line through it remained open for passenger services until 1966. It was rebuilt and reopened as Mount Vernon on 4 October 1993 by British Rail.

Services

From 1993 
One train per hour each way is extended to/from Motherwell. There is also an all-year hourly service each way on Sundays for the first time since the line reopened in 1993 (Sunday services had previously operated only on the four weeks up to Christmas for shoppers). Prior to electrification, the service was operated by Class 156s and 158s, and ran to/from Glasgow Central High Level.

References

Notes

Sources
 
 

Railway stations in Glasgow
Former Caledonian Railway stations
Railway stations in Great Britain opened in 1866
Railway stations in Great Britain closed in 1943
Railway stations in Great Britain opened in 1993
SPT railway stations
Railway stations served by ScotRail
1866 establishments in Scotland
1943 disestablishments in Scotland